Arnage may refer to:
 Arnage, Aberdeenshire a village in Scotland
 Arnage Castle, a country house incorporating a 16th-century tower
 Arnage Primary School, a rural school
 Arnage railway station, a station on the Formartine and Buchan Railway
 Bentley Arnage, a model of luxury car
 Arnage, Sarthe, a commune of the Sarthe département in France
 The Arnage corner of the Circuit de la Sarthe, a racetrack in France (likely named after the above community)